Trestonia nivea is a species of beetle in the family Cerambycidae. It was described by Martins and Galileo in 1990. It is known from Brazil, Suriname and French Guiana.

References

nivea
Beetles described in 1990